Scott Shepherd may refer to:

 Scott Shepherd (actor)
 Scott Shepherd (producer)
 Scott Shepherd (footballer) (born 1996), Scottish football player (Falkirk FC)

See also
 Scott S. Sheppard, American astronomer